Dibrova is an urban-type settlement in Korosten Raion, Zhytomyr Oblast, Ukraine. Population:  In 2001, population was 197.

The area was strongly contaminated as the result of the Chernobyl disaster, and Dibrova was included in 1989 into the zone of mandatory resettlement. The population was partially but not fully resettled.

References

Urban-type settlements in Korosten Raion